A Matter of Life and Death and A Matter of the Beast were two concert tours by Iron Maiden from 2006 to 2007. The first tour was unique, as the set list primarily consisted of the band's most recent release, A Matter of Life and Death, in its entirety, although this got a mixed response from audiences. Unusually, the first leg did not include "The Number of the Beast", a song which Iron Maiden had previously played on every tour since its inception. The second part of the tour, in celebration of The Number of the Beast's 25th anniversary, saw the band playing four songs from said album as well as five from A Matter of Life and Death (although they had initially planned to play five songs from both releases).

Set
Throughout the tour, the stage would be decorated to look like a First World War trench, with the wall canvases featuring painted sandbags and barbed wire, the stage floor decorated with barbed wire and mud as well as actual sandbags placed in front of the monitors. The podiums at the end of each runway came with actual barbed wire and searchlights (operated by Dickinson) and the bodies of two parachutists would appear from the lighting rig during "The Longest Day" (during "Iron Maiden" in 2007). As with previous tours, Nicko McBrain's drumkit featured a Sooty puppet, this time dressed in army attire.

During "Iron Maiden," a tank would appear from the back of the set (the rear runway transforming into the tank's wheels), topped with a binocular-wielding Eddie with flashing LED lights. The walk-on Eddie would also appear as an armed soldier during "The Evil That Men Do."

Opening acts
Lauren Harris
Trivium
Bullet for My Valentine
3 Inches of Blood
Motörhead
Machine Head
Parikrama
In Flames
Mastodon

Setlist

To celebrate the 25th anniversary of The Number of the Beast, the band announced that they would play five songs each from The Number of the Beast and A Matter of Life and Death throughout the 2007 part of the tour. However, only four songs from The Number of the Beast were actually played, which meant that "Children of the Damned" would be the only rarity in the setlist.

Tour dates

Reference

References

External links
 Official website
 A Matter of Life and Death Tour Dates

Iron Maiden concert tours
2006 concert tours
2007 concert tours